Seksendört (also known as Grup 84) is a Turkish pop rock band from Ankara.

Seksendört consists of Tuna Velibaşoğlu, Arif Erdem Ocak, Serter Karadeniz, and Okan Özen. The band was formed in 1999 and started getting noticed under the name 'Seksendört' in 2005. The band became very popular in Turkey with their album K.G.B.

Band members 
Tuna Velibaşoğlu Singing, Guitar
Okan Özen Bass guitar
Serter Karadeniz Drum kit

Discography 
Seksendört (2005)
K.G.B (2008)
Akıyor Zaman (2011)
Rüya (Hande Yener & Seksendört) (2012)
Faili Meçhul (Maxi Single) (2014)

Singles
 Haber Yok (Single) (2010)
 Acemiler (2015)

References

External links 
Official website

Turkish rock music groups
Musical groups from Ankara